San Jose and Lakeview station is a light rail stop on the Muni Metro M Ocean View line, located in the Ingleside  neighborhood of San Francisco, California. The station opened with the extension of the line to Balboa Park station on August 30, 1980. The stop has very small traffic islands where trains stop before crossing Lakeview Avenue, so most passengers cross a vehicle travel lanes on San Jose Avenue to board or depart trains. The stop is not accessible to people with disabilities.

The stop is also served by the  route which provides service along the M Ocean View line during the early morning when trains do not operate.

References

External links 
SFMTA – San Jose Ave and Lakeview Ave inbound and outbound
SFBay Transit (unofficial) – San Jose Ave & Lakeview Ave

Muni Metro stations
Railway stations in the United States opened in 1980